List matches of Serbia men's national volleyball team conducted by Nikola Grbić, who was head coach of Serbian national team from February 3, 2015, to August 16, 2019.

Achievements

2015 Official matches

2015 FIVB World League

Week 3 
Venue:  Mineirinho Arena, Belo Horizonte, Brazil

|-bgcolor=#ffcccc 
|-bgcolor=#ffcccc 
|}

Week 4 
Venue:  Adriatic Arena, Pesaro, Italy
Venue:  Land Rover Arena, Bologna, Italy

|-bgcolor=#CCFFCC 
|-bgcolor=#ffcccc 
|}

Week 5 
Venue:  SPC Vojvodina, Novi Sad, Serbia
Venue:  Pionir Hall, Belgrade, Serbia

|-bgcolor=#CCFFCC 
|-bgcolor=#ffcccc 
|}

Week 6 
Venue:  SPC Vojvodina, Novi Sad, Serbia
Venue:  Pionir Hall, Belgrade, Serbia

|-bgcolor=#CCFFCC 
|-bgcolor=#CCFFCC 
|}

Week 7 
Venue:  SPC Vojvodina, Novi Sad, Serbia
Venue:  Pionir Hall, Belgrade, Serbia

|-bgcolor=#CCFFCC 
|-bgcolor=#CCFFCC 
|}

Week 8 
Venue:  State Basketball Centre, Wantirna South, Australia

|-bgcolor=#CCFFCC 
|-bgcolor=#ffcccc 
|}

Final Round 
Venue:  Ginásio do Maracanãzinho, Rio de Janeiro, Brazil
*All times are Brasília Time (UTC−03:00).

|-bgcolor=#ffcccc 
|-bgcolor=#CCFFCC 
|}

Semifinals 

|-bgcolor=#CCFFCC  
|}

Final 

|-bgcolor=#ffcccc 
|}

2015 CEV European Championship

Pool D
Venue:  PalaYamamay, Busto Arsizio, Italy
* All times are Central European Summer Time (UTC+02:00)

|-bgcolor=#CCFFCC  
|-bgcolor=#CCFFCC  
|-bgcolor=#ffcccc 
|}

Playoffs

|-bgcolor=#CCFFCC  
|}

Quarterfinals

|-bgcolor=#ffcccc 
|}

2016 Official matches

2016 European Olympics qualification

* All times are Central European Time (UTC+01:00)

Pool A

|-bgcolor=#ffcccc 
|-bgcolor=#ffcccc 
|-bgcolor=#CCFFCC 
|}

2016 FIVB World League

Pool C1 
Venue:  Yantarny Sports Complex, Kaliningrad, Russia
*All times are Kaliningrad Time (UTC+02:00).

|-bgcolor=#CCFFCC  
|-bgcolor=#CCFFCC   
|-bgcolor=#CCFFCC  
|}

Pool F1 
Venue:  Hall Aleksandar Nikolić, Belgrade, Serbia
*All times are Central European Summer Time (UTC+02:00).

|-bgcolor=#CCFFCC  
|-bgcolor=#CCFFCC  
|-bgcolor=#CCFFCC  
|}

Pool I1 
Venue:  Azadi Indoor Stadium, Tehran, Iran
*All times are Iran Daylight Time (UTC+04:30).

|-bgcolor=#ffcccc 
|-bgcolor=#ffcccc 
|-bgcolor=#CCFFCC  
|}

Final Round 
Venue:  Tauron Arena Kraków, Kraków, Poland
*All times are Central European Summer Time (UTC+02:00).

|-bgcolor=#CCFFCC 
|-bgcolor=#ffcccc 
|}

Semifinals 

|-bgcolor=#CCFFCC 
|}

Final 

|-bgcolor=#CCFFCC 
|}

2017 Official matches

2018 FIVB World Championship qualification (CEV)

Pool E
Venue:  Dom odbojke Bojan Stranic, Zagreb, Croatia
Dates: 24–28 May 2017
*All times are Central European Summer Time (UTC+02:00).

|-bgcolor=#CCFFCC 
|-bgcolor=#CCFFCC 
|-bgcolor=#CCFFCC 
|-bgcolor=#CCFFCC 
|-bgcolor=#CCFFCC 
|}

2017 FIVB World League

Pool B1 
Venue:  SPC Vojvodina, Novi Sad, Serbia
*All times are Central European Summer Time (UTC+02:00).

|-bgcolor=#CCFFCC 
|-bgcolor=#ffcccc 
|-bgcolor=#CCFFCC 
|}

Pool D1 
Venue:  Azadi Indoor Stadium, Tehran, Iran
*All times are Iran Daylight Time (UTC+04:30).

|-bgcolor=#CCFFCC 
|-bgcolor=#CCFFCC 
|-bgcolor=#CCFFCC 
|}

Pool G1 
Venue:  Orfeo Superdomo, Córdoba, Argentina
*All times are Argentina Time (UTC−03:00).

|-bgcolor=#CCFFCC 
|-bgcolor=#ffcccc 
|-bgcolor=#ffcccc 
|}

Final Round 
Venue:  Arena da Baixada, Curitiba, Brazil
*All times are Brasília Time (UTC−03:00).

|-bgcolor=#ffcccc 
|-bgcolor=#ffcccc 
|}

2017 CEV European Championship

All times are local Central European Summer Time (UTC+2).

Pool A

|-bgcolor=#CCFFCC 
|-bgcolor=#CCFFCC 
|-bgcolor=#CCFFCC 
|}

Quarterfinals

|-bgcolor=#CCFFCC 
|}

Semifinals

|-bgcolor=#ffcccc 
|}

Third place game

|-bgcolor=#CCFFCC 
|}

2018 Official matches

2018 FIVB Nations League

Pool 4
Venue:  Kraljevo Sports Hall, Kraljevo, Serbia
*All times are Central European Summer Time (UTC+02:00).

|-bgcolor=#ffcccc 
|-bgcolor=#CCFFCC 
|-bgcolor=#ffcccc 
|}

Pool 5
Venue:  Armeets Arena, Sofia, Bulgaria
*All times are Eastern European Summer Time (UTC+03:00).

|-bgcolor=#CCFFCC 
|-bgcolor=#CCFFCC 
|-bgcolor=#CCFFCC 
|}

Pool 12
Venue:  L'arena du pays d'Aix, Aix-en-Provence, France
*All times are Central European Summer Time (UTC+02:00).

|-bgcolor=#CCFFCC 
|-bgcolor=#CCFFCC 
|-bgcolor=#ffcccc 
|}

Pool 15
Venue:  Sears Centre Arena, Hoffman Estates, United States
*All times are Central Daylight Time (UTC−05:00).

|-bgcolor=#ffcccc 
|-bgcolor=#CCFFCC 
|-bgcolor=#CCFFCC 
|}

Pool 18
Venue:  Jiangmen Sports Center Gymnasium, Jiangmen, China
*All times are China Standard Time (UTC+08:00).

|-bgcolor=#CCFFCC 
|-bgcolor=#CCFFCC 
|-bgcolor=#CCFFCC 
|}

Final round
Venue:  Stade Pierre-Mauroy, Lille, France
*All times are Central European Summer Time (UTC+02:00).

|-bgcolor=#ffcccc 
|-bgcolor=#ffcccc 
|}

2018 FIVB World Championship

Pool C
Venue:  PalaFlorio, Bari, Italy
*All times are Central European Summer Time (UTC+02:00).

|-bgcolor=#ffcccc 
|-bgcolor=#CCFFCC 
|-bgcolor=#CCFFCC 
|-bgcolor=#CCFFCC 
|-bgcolor=#CCFFCC 
|}

Pool H
Venue:  Palace of Culture and Sports, Varna, Bulgaria
*All times are Eastern European Summer Time (UTC+03:00).

|-bgcolor=#CCFFCC 
|-bgcolor=#CCFFCC 
|-bgcolor=#ffcccc 
|}

Pool J
Venue:  Pala Alpitour, Turin, Italy
*All times are Central European Summer Time (UTC+02:00).

|-bgcolor=#CCFFCC 
|-bgcolor=#ffcccc 
|}

Semifinals

|-bgcolor=#ffcccc 
|}

3rd place match

|-bgcolor=#ffcccc 
|}

2019 Official matches

2019 FIVB Nations League

Pool 4
Venue:  Spodek, Katowice, Poland
*All times are Central European Summer Time (UTC+02:00).

|-bgcolor=#ffcccc 
|-bgcolor=#ffcccc 
|-bgcolor=#ffcccc 
|}

Pool 8
Venue:  TD Place Arena, Ottawa, Canada
*All times are Eastern Daylight Time (UTC−04:00).

|-bgcolor=#ffcccc 
|-bgcolor=#CCFFCC 
|-bgcolor=#CCFFCC  
|}

Pool 9
Venue:  Multiusos de Gondomar, Gondomar, Portugal
*All times are Western European Summer Time (UTC+01:00).

|-bgcolor=#CCFFCC 
|-bgcolor=#CCFFCC 
|-bgcolor=#CCFFCC 
|}

Pool 14
Venue:  PalaLido, Milan, Italy
*All times are Central European Summer Time (UTC+02:00).

|-bgcolor=#ffcccc 
|-bgcolor=#ffcccc 
|-bgcolor=#ffcccc 
|}

Pool 19
Venue:  Kolodruma, Plovdiv, Bulgaria
*All times are Eastern European Summer Time (UTC+03:00).

|-bgcolor=#ffcccc 
|-bgcolor=#ffcccc 
|-bgcolor=#CCFFCC 
|}

2019 FIVB Intercontinental Olympic Qualification

Pool C
Venue:  PalaFlorio, Bari, Italy
*All times are Central European Summer Time (UTC+02:00).

|-bgcolor=#CCFFCC 
|-bgcolor=#CCFFCC 
|-bgcolor=#ffcccc 
|}

Friendly matches

2015 Preparatory game
All times are local Central European Summer Time (UTC+2).

Serbia - Bulgaria (22 May 2015)

Venue:  SC Voždovac, Belgrade, Serbia

|-bgcolor=#ffcccc 
|}

Serbia - Bulgaria (23 May 2015)

|-bgcolor=#ffcccc 
|}

Serbia - Netherlands (17 Sep 2015)

Venue:  Pionir Hall, Belgrade, Serbia

|-bgcolor=#CCFFCC 
|}

Serbia - Netherlands (19 Sep 2015)

|-bgcolor=#ffcccc 
|}

Serbia - Bulgaria (28 Dec 2015)

Venue:  Pionir Hall, Belgrade, Serbia

|-bgcolor=#CCFFCC 
|}

Serbia - Bulgaria (29 Dec 2015)

|-bgcolor=#CCFFCC 
|}

2016 Preparatory game
All times are local Central European Summer Time (UTC+2).

Italy - Serbia (8 June 2016)

Venue:  Palatrieste, Trieste, Italy

|-bgcolor=#CCFFCC 
|}

Italy - Serbia (9 June 2016)

Venue:  Palazzetto dello Sport, Cividale del Friuli, Italy

|-bgcolor=#ffcccc 
|}

2017 Preparatory game

All times are local Central European Summer Time (UTC+2).

Slovenia - Serbia (20 May 2017)

Venue:  Šoštanj Topolšica, Šoštanj, Slovenia

|-bgcolor=#CCFFCC 
|}

Slovenia - Serbia (21 May 2017)

Venue:  Stozice, Ljubljana, Slovenia

|-bgcolor=#CCFFCC 
|}

Serbia - Slovenia (17 Aug 2017)

Venue:  Master Zemun, Belgrade, Serbia

|-bgcolor=#CCFFCC 
|}

Serbia - Slovenia (18 Aug 2017)

|-bgcolor=#CCFFCC 
|}

2018 Preparatory game

All times are local Central European Summer Time (UTC+2).

France - Serbia (31 Aug 2018)

Venue:  AccorHotels Arena, Paris, France

|-bgcolor=#CCFFCC 
|}

France - Serbia (2 Sep 2018)

Venue:  Pierre de Coubertin, Paris, France

|-bgcolor=#ffcccc 
|}

2019 Preparatory game
Venue:  SC Impuls, Belgrade, Serbia
All times are local Central European Summer Time (UTC+2).

Serbia - Bulgaria (24 May 2019)

|-bgcolor=#ffcccc 
|}

Serbia - Bulgaria (25 May 2019)

|-bgcolor=#CCFFCC 
|}

Serbia - Bulgaria (24 July 2019)

|-bgcolor=#ffcccc 
|}

Serbia - Bulgaria (25 July 2019)

|-bgcolor=#CCFFCC 
|}

Friendly Tournament

2016 Memoriał Huberta Jerzego Wagnera

Venue:  Tauron Arena, Kraków, Poland
All times are local Central European Summer Time (UTC+2).

|-bgcolor=#CCFFCC 
|-bgcolor=#ffcccc 
|-bgcolor=#CCFFCC 
|}

2019 Memoriał Huberta Jerzego Wagnera

Venue:  Tauron Arena, Kraków, Poland
All times are local Central European Summer Time (UTC+2).

|-bgcolor=#ffcccc 
|-bgcolor=#CCFFCC 
|-bgcolor=#ffcccc 
|}

See also
Serbia men's national volleyball team
Matches of Serbian men's volleyball national team conducted by Slobodan Kovač

References

National men's volleyball teams
Serbian volleyball coaches
Serbian men's volleyball players
Men's sport in Serbia
Volleyball in Serbia